Eusebio Peñalver Mazorra (1936–2006) was an Afro-Cuban anti-Castro political prisoner who was captured in 1960 during the Cuban governments War Against the Bandits and spent 28 years in prison before being released in 1988.

Early life
He was born in Ciego de Avila, Camagüey, Cuba on July 1, 1936.

Imprisonment
Peñalver alleged that during his time in prison he "suffered the most brutal tortures as a result of continuous harassment for 24 hours a day and seven days a week" and that these "tortures" allowed him to build "a shield of virile resistance" as a "plantado." In a 1999 interview with The Associated Press, he defined a "plantado" as a person who firmly plants his feet while struggling for freedom and democracy in Cuba.

During the presidency of George W. Bush, Bush referred to Peñalver as a patriot.

He died in Miami in 2006.

References

2006 deaths
Opposition to Fidel Castro
Cuban anti-communists
Cuban dissidents
1936 births